Agusan was a province of the Philippines. It was created on August 20, 1907, by Provincial Government Act No. 1693, and dissolved on November 14, 1967, by Republic Act No. 4979.

History

Prior to its creation as an independent province, Agusan was divided between the provinces/districts of Misamis, and Surigao during the Spanish colonial period. In 1907, Agusan was separated from Misamis, and Surigao creating the Agusan province through the sub-provinces of Bukidnon, and Butuan.

The sub-province of Bukidnon became an independent province in 1914 through Act No. 2408 and Butuan sub-province assumed the name of Agusan. Both Agusan and Bukidnon were put under the Department of Mindanao and Sulu from 1914 to 1920.

In 1967, Agusan was dissolved and was splitted into two provinces of Agusan del Norte, and Agusan del Sur.

See also
Agusan del Norte
Agusan del Sur
Bukidnon

References

Former provinces of the Philippines
States and territories established in 1907
1907 establishments in the Philippines
States and territories disestablished in 1967
1967 disestablishments in the Philippines